Raden Ayu Siti Hartinah (23 August 1923 – 28 April 1996), also known as Siti Hartinah Soeharto or Tien Soeharto, was the First Lady of Indonesia from 1967 until 1996. She was the wife of second Indonesian president, Suharto. 

Known as Ibu Tien in Indonesia, she was widely acknowledged to have been politically powerful, and a close confidant and political advisor to Suharto.

Biography 

Siti Hartinah was distantly related to the Mangkunegaran Royal household. Some commentators state that her honorific title of Raden Ayu was reserved only for faithful commoner courtiers or servants (abdi dalem) of the Mangkunegaran court.

She married Suharto on 26 December 1947 in Surakarta using a traditional Javanese ceremony. The Javanese custom was for the bride's family to pay the bulk of the wedding costs. Suharto apparently drove there in a battered De Soto sedan. Suharto stated that the marriage was initially not one of romantic love, but they did eventually grow to love each other devotedly, a type of marriage that was very common for many Javanese of that era. Three days after their marriage, Siti Hartinah was taken by Suharto to live in his Yogyakarta house at Jalan Merbabu 2.

Her marriage was initiated by Suharto's foster mother at the time, Ibu (Mrs) Prawirowiharjo, who sought an audience with her mother. Ibu Prawirowiharjo cultivated a close relationship with her mother, a family in Suharto's own words as "well regarded and respected in the city of Solo"

Siti Hartinah became known in Indonesia as "Madame Tien". Many Javanese saw her as one of the major causes of Suharto's own power.

Siti Hartinah died of heart failure on April 28 1996 in Jakarta, and is interred beside her husband in the Astana Giribangun mausoleum complex in Karanganyar Regency, Central Java.

Family
Suharto and Siti Hartinah had six children, Siti Hardiyanti Rukmana (Tutut), Sigit Harjojudanto (Sigit), Bambang Trihatmodjo (Bambang), Siti Hediati (Titiek), Hutomo Mandala Putra (Tommy) and Siti Hutami Endang Adiningsih (Mamiek), and 11 grandchildren and several great-grandchildren.

See also
List of awards and honours received by Siti Hartinah

Notes

References

Citations

General
Suharto: A Political Biography. Robert Edward Elson. Cambridge University Press, 2001. 
Siti Hartinah Soeharto : First Lady of Indonesia. Abdul Gafur. PT. Citra Lamtoro Gung Persada, 1992. ISBN unknown
Who's Who in Indonesia. Mahiddin Mahmud. Gunung Agung, 1990. ISBN unknown

External links

  Biography on TokohIndonesia.com
 1996 news:Madame Ten was buried

|-

|-

1923 births
1996 deaths
Indonesian Muslims
Javanese people
People from Surakarta
National Heroes of Indonesia
Suharto family and associates
Cendana family
First ladies and gentlemen of Indonesia
Grand Crosses Special Class of the Order of Merit of the Federal Republic of Germany